Susan Ressler (born 1949 Philadelphia) is an American photographer.

Her work is included in the collections of the National Gallery of Canada, the Smithsonian American Art Museum and the Harwood Museum of Art.

References

21st-century American photographers
20th-century American photographers
1949 births
Living people
20th-century American women photographers
21st-century American women photographers
Artists in the Smithsonian American Art Museum collection